Slate Mountain is an unincorporated community located in northeast Surry County, North Carolina, United States between the Ararat River and Archies Creek .  The community of Slate Mountain is named for the nearby summit of Slate Mountain which has an elevation 1,966 feet.

References

Unincorporated communities in Surry County, North Carolina
Unincorporated communities in North Carolina